Area code 914 is the telephone area code in the North American Numbering Plan (NANP) for Westchester County, New York.

Area code 914 was one of the first area codes announced when the North American Numbering Plan was created in October 1947, when it was assigned to a numbering plan area (NPA) comprising Delaware, Dutchess, Nassau, Orange, Putnam, Rockland, Suffolk, Sullivan, Ulster, and Westchester counties, an area largely coextensive with the New York state portion of the New York metropolitan area, excluding New York City, which received area code 212. In 1951, Long Island (Nassau and Suffolk counties) received area code 516 in a split of 914.

This configuration remained for 49 years. By the end of the 1990s, the increasing demand for cell phones and Internet dial-up connections caused concerns for exhaustion of the numbering pool. In mitigation, numbering plan area 914 was reduced to Westchester County on June 5, 2000. The remainder was assigned the new area code 845. Area code 914 was retained by all cellphones in use in the plan area before the split.

Prior to October 2021, area code 914 had telephone numbers assigned for the central office code 988. In 2020, 988 was designated nationwide as a dialing code for the National Suicide Prevention Lifeline, which created a conflict for exchanges that permit seven-digit dialing. This area code was therefore scheduled to transition to ten-digit dialing by October 24, 2021.

See also
List of New York area codes
List of NANP area codes

References

External links

Interactive Map of Area Code 914
914/845 prefix split information

Westchester County, New York
914
914
Telecommunications-related introductions in 1947